Golo Brdo may refer to:

 Golo Brdo, Bijeljina, a village near Bijeljina, Bosnia and Herzegovina
 Golo Brdo (Bugojno), a village near Bugojno, Bosnia and Herzegovina
 Golo Brdo, Brda, a village in Slovenia
 Golo Brdo, Medvode, a village in Slovenia
 Golo Brdo, Kneževo, a village near Kneževo, Bosnia and Herzegovina
 Golo Brdo, Croatia, a village near Virovitica
 Golloborda, a region of Albania